The Volkswagen Type 1 automobile, also known as the Volkswagen Beetle or Bug, is known colloquially by various names in different countries, usually local renderings of the word "beetle". Among these are:

Bug or Beetle-Bug in the US
Bogár (beetle) or bogárhátú (beetle-back) in Hungary
金龜車 ("Jin-guei che") in Taiwan
Agroga عكروكة (little frog), Rag-gah ركـّة (little turtle) in Iraq
חיפושית ("Hipushit", beetle) or Bimba in Israel
ビートル ("Bītoru", beetle) in Japan
Bjalla (beetle) in Iceland
Kodok (frog) in Indonesia
Ghoorbaghei (قورباغه ای) (frog) in Iran
Буба (beetle) in North Macedonia
Kifuu (small bowl) in Kenya
Vabole (beetle) in Latvia
Vabalas (beetle) in Lithuania
Kura (turtle), Kodok (frog) in Malaysia
Kashima in Namibia
Bhyagute car (frog car) in Nepal
Boble (bubble) in Norway
Cepillo (brush or ice shaver) in Dominican Republic
خنفسة ("khon-fesa", beetle) in Egypt
Fakrouna (tortoise) in Libya
Põrnikas (beetle) in Estonia
Baratinha (little cockroach) in Cape Verde
Escarabat (beetle) in Catalan
Poncho in Chile and Venezuela
甲壳虫 ("Jiǎ Ké Chóng", beetle) in China
Buba (bug) in Croatia
Brouk (beetle) in Czech Republic
Sapito (little toad) in Perú
Carocha (beetle) in Portugal
Volky in Puerto Rico
Broasca, Broscuţă (little frog), Buburuza (ladybird) in Romania
Фольксваген-жук ("Folksvagen-zhuk", Volkswagen bug) in Ukraine
Жук ("Zhuk", beetle) in Russia
Буба ("Buba", bug) in Serbia
Qongqothwane (beetle), Volla or Volksie (little Volkswagen), Kewer (beetle) in South Africa
Chrobák (beetle) in Slovakia
Hrošč (beetle) in Slovenia
Volks, Beetle or Ibba (turtle) in Sri Lanka
Mgongo wa Chura (frog's back)in Tanzania
Con Bọ (bug) in Vietnam
Bhamba Datya ("Datya", frog) in Zimbabwe
Tortuga (tortoise) in Panama
Цох(beetle) in Mongolia
 "فولوکس"   ("Foloks", philosopher), in Afghanistan
Buba ("the bug") in Montenegro
Super Beetle or Super Bug in North America 
Banju Maqlub (literally, a bathtub turned upside down) in Malta
Viwii in Malawi

Foxi or Foxy  in most of Pakistan and Daddu-car (frog car) in Punjabi speaking parts of Pakistan
Mgongo wa Chura (frog's back), Mwendo wa Kobe (tortoise speed) in Swahili
Folka (Volkswagen), Bagge (short for Skalbagge, beetle), Bubbla (bubble) in Sweden and Swedish-speaking Finland
Cucaracha or Cucarachita (cockroach, little cockroach) in Guatemala, El Salvador and Honduras
Bingus, Ijapa,  Mbe, or Tortoise Car in Nigeria
Beetle in the UK, and in many English speaking  Commonwealth countries (e.g. Australia & New Zealand) 
Maggiolino (maybug, cockchafer), Maggiolone (big beetle) in Italy
Käfer (beetle) in Germany, Austria and Alemannic Switzerland
Kever in Dutch-speaking Belgium and the Netherlands
Pichirilo in Ecuador and Colombia
Pulga (flea), Escarabajo (beetle) in Colombia
ඉබ්බා  (tortoise) in Sri Lanka
Vocho, Vochito or Volcho (navel) in Mexico,  Costa Rica, Colombia and Perú
Fusca in Brazil, Paraguay and Uruguay (from "fauvê", "VW" in German pronunciation), Fusquinha (little VW) in Brazil, Fusquita (little VW) in Uruguay
Escarabajo (beetle) in Argentina, Chile, Colombia, Paraguay, Perú, Spain, Uruguay, El Salvador, Costa Rica, Panama
Peta (turtle) in Bolivia
Pendong, Kotseng kuba (hunchback car), Pagong, Ba-o, (turtle), Boks (tin can), sometimes Beetle in the Philippines
Garbus (hunchback) in Poland
Folcika or Buba (bug) in Bosnia and Herzegovina
Косτенурка ("Kostenurka", turtle), Бръмбар ("Brambar", beetle) in Bulgaria
Boblen (The bubble), Bobbelfolkevogn (bubble Volkswagen), Asfaltboblen (The asphalt bubble), Billen (The Beetle) gravid rulleskøjte (pregnant rollerskate) or Hitlerslæden (Hitler-sled) in Denmark
Kupla (bubble), Kuplavolkkari (bubble Volkswagen), Aatun kosto (Adi's revenge) in Finland
Coccinelle (ladybug) in France, French-speaking Belgium and Switzerland, Algeria, Quebec and Haiti 
Choupette (Herbie's name in the French version of the movie) in French Canada
Σκαθάρι ("Skathari", beetle), Σκαραβαίος ("Skaraveos", scarab), Χελώνα ("Chelona", turtle), Κατσαριδάκι ("Katsaridaki", little cockroach) in Greece
Sedán (sedan car), Pulguita (little flea), Vocho/Vochito or Bocho/Bochito (little Volkswagen) in Mexico and across Latin Americaรถเต่า ("Rod Tao", turtle car), โฟล์คเต่า ("Volk Tao", Volkswagen turtle) in ThaiKaplumbağa (turtle), Tosbağa (tortoise), Vosvos'' in Turkey

References

External links
 MousePlanet ('slug bug')

Volkswagen Beetle

de:VW Käfer#Namensgebung
fr:Volkswagen Coccinelle#Succès populaire